Maghnus Ua Conchobair, Prince of Connacht, died 1181.

Family background

Maghnus was a son of King Tairrdelbach Ua Conchobair (1088-1156) and one of his six wives.

Crich Coirpre

Maghnus and his brother, Brian Luighnech Ua Conchobhair, were killed at the battle of Crich Coirpre in County Sligo by King Flaithbertaigh of Tyrconnell. The battle occurred "on the Saturday before Whitsuntide", "Sixteen of the sons of the lords and chieftains of Connacht were slain by the Kinel Connell, as well as many others, both of the nobles and the plebeians".

As a result of this battle, "They (the Cenel Conaill) held the Connacians under subjection for a long time." Among the notable dead were two sons of Aed Ua Conchobair, Aed mac Conchobair Ua Cellaigh, Gilla Crist Ua Roduibh, Eachmarchach Ua Murray, a son of Mortough Ua Conchobair, "three of the O'Mulrenins; the two Mac Gillaboys; and Hugh, son of Hugh, who was the son of Roderic, together with many others of the nobility".

Brian Luighneach's son, Donogh, was also killed.

Children and descendants

Maghnus's descendants were known as the Clann Maghnusa (LNG, pp. 398–99), which Jaski identifies as Mac Magnusa of Tir Tuathail (EIKS, p. 316). This would place them in County Roscommon. Today, people from the McManus, MacManus, McMannes, Mannus, Mannis  and MacManners families trace their heritage back to the sons of Maghnus. 

Magnus had the following known offspring:

 Muircheartach - alive 1230
 Diarmaid - His son Manus was killed in 1237. Another son, son Conchobair, was killed in 1279
 Domnall - A great-grandson, Teige, a man distinguished for his hospitality, was slain [in 1307) by Cathal, the son of Donnell, son of Teige O'Conor.
 Riocaird - In Leabhar na nGenealach, Dubhaltach MacFhirbhisigh states that a clann Riocaird is from Riocard s. Maghnus s. Toirdhealbhach Mor; from him it was first named, i.e., it was called Clann Riocaird, for it was by (?) and from that Clann Riocard that Meic Cathail Leithdheirg came. Riocaird does not appear in the annals.

References

 Early Irish Kingship and Succession, Bart Jaski, Four Courts Press, Dublin, 2000
 Leabhar na nGenealach, Dubhaltach MacFhirbhisigh, edited Nollaig O Muraile, pp. 398–99, volume III. Dublin, 2004-2005

People from County Galway
People from County Roscommon
12th-century Irish people
Medieval Gaels from Ireland